Miralay Halid Beg Cibran  (born 1882 in Varto, Muş; 14 April 1925 in Bitlis) was a Kurdish soldier in the Ottoman Army and chairman of the Azadî organization.

Early life and education 
He was born in Varto in 1882. His father Mahmud Bey was the chieftain (ağa) of the Sunni Kurdish Cibran tribe. The Cibran was an influential Kurmanji speaking Kurdish tribe and used to work closely with the Ottoman government. In exchange the Cibrans were allowed to set up regiments for the Hamidiye cavalry. Halid Beg has attended the Aşiret (tribal) school in Istanbul. Afterwards he has followed up on his studies at the Ottoman Military College.

Military career 
In 1892, he became the leader of the second Hamidiye regiment and was in charge of leading the attack on Zeynel Talu Hermekli in 1894, the son of the Alevi Ibrahim Talu, who was killed by troops of the second Hamidiye regiment under the command of Halid Beg Cibran in 1906. The Alevi tribes wouldn't forget such treatment by the Sunni, and wouldn't join the Sheikh Said Rebellion in 1925. During World War I, he was deployed in the eastern front, and fought against then Armenians. It is reported that concerned about the possible betrayal of the Alevi Kurds, he sent a message to General Kazim Karabekir, urging him to refuse their support in the battles. During the Turkish War of Independence, he sided with Mustafa Kemal (Atatürk) and took a stand against the government in İstanbul.

Kurdish rebellions 
After the war, he returned to the Dersim region, made first attempts to counter the Turkish nationalism and support the Kurdish cause, implying the Kurds to speak their language. Following the signing of the Treaty of Sèvres in 1920, he garnered support for the Kurdish aims for self rule. He visited various towns in the region, such as Varto, Bingöl, Bulanik or Malazgirt and spoke to the Kurdish notables. But after the Koçgiri uprising, he began to oppose the Kemalists.  According to Kurds reporting to the British intelligence, he established Azadi in Erzurum, the city where he formerly was a military commander, in 1921  of which he became its president. The Azadi was a Kurdish society which later would become a leading force in the Sheikh Said Rebellion. He led the uprising at Beytüşşebap in 1924. 

He was captured in Erzurum on 20 December 1924 reportedly after having been accused of his involvement in the Beytüssebap revolt by Yusuf Zia Bey (another leader of the Beytüssebap revolt). Both were courtmartialed in Bitlis and Halid Beg Cibran was hanged on the 14 April 1925.

References 

Ottoman Army personnel
Kurdish revolutionaries
1882 births
1925 deaths
Kurdish independence activists
Ottoman military personnel of World War I
Turkish military personnel of the Turkish War of Independence